Adam Shaïek (born 6 April 1989) is a French professional football player, who currently plays in the Championnat National for SR Colmar.

Career
He played on the professional level in Ligue 2 for Troyes AC and played his debut on 10 October 2008 against AC Ajaccio. He left after on 31 May 2010 ES Troyes AC and signed for SR Colmar.

Notes

1989 births
Living people
People from Champigny-sur-Marne
French footballers
Ligue 2 players
ES Troyes AC players
French sportspeople of Tunisian descent
Association football midfielders
Footballers from Val-de-Marne